Rangappa Hogbitna is a 2011 Indian Kannada comedy film directed and written by M. L. Prasanna. The film stars Ramesh Aravind and Sanjjanaa in the lead roles. The story is inspired by the Hollywood comedy film Death at a Funeral (2010). The film is produced by Mahesh Kothari under Shanta Enterprises banner. M L Prasanna himself has composed the music.

Plot
The film is a laugh riot telling the story of an almost dying old man named Rangappa.

Cast
 Ramesh Aravind as Ramesh
 Sanjjanaa Galrani as Sneha, Ramesh's wife
 Ravikiran as Suresh, Ramesh's brother
 Mandeep Roy a doctor
 Sihi Kahi Chandru
 K. V. Manjayya as Raju, Ramesh's uncle
 Layendra Kokila as Venkata
 Girish Bhat
 Sanchari Vijay as Krishna
 Sathish Ninasam
 NGEF Manju

Soundtrack

 "Rangappa Hogbitna" - Singer :Hemanth Kumar, Music & lyrics : M. L. Prasanna

Reception

Critical response 

A critic from Bangalore Mirror wrote  "Most of the actors have done justice to their roles; SihiKahi Chandru and Layendra stand out. The background score that often tries to force laughter on the audience is annoying.No doubt, the film is made on shoe-string budget. Good for one watch on the big screen, but it will be a great fodder for film-starved television channels". Sunayana Suresh from DNA wrote "One’s heart goes out to Ramesh Arvind, whose comic timing and antics seem to be like a lone warrior in a battle. Makers like this need to be reprimanded, as they’ve fooled the audiences in the cinema halls with a sorry excuse for a film and have made their money on the sly through their television rights. Tsk tsk!". A critic from NDTV wrote "Ramesh Arvind as usual has given his best, but it is glamorous Sanjjana who impresses in the role of a housewife. Veteran actors Sihi Kahi Chandru, Mandeep Rai and Layendra impress in their respective roles. Rangappa Hogbitnaa is a good one-time watch". B S Srivani from Deccan Herald wrote "Prasanna manages to deliver through most of the film, though Cajetan Dias’ background score spoils the impact. Sihi Kahi Chandru as the father of two daughters and a son who comes to a bitter realisation is first class. Another surprise is Sanjana who is finally at ease while performing - another potential to be realised here.  Recommended one-time watch minus the thinking cap".

References

External links 

2011 films
2010s Kannada-language films
Indian comedy films
Indian remakes of British films
Indian remakes of American films
2011 comedy films